This is a list of historical by-elections for the South Australian Legislative Council. They were caused by the resignation or death of an incumbent member.

History
From inauguration until the 1975 election and the introduction of South Australian Legislative Council appointments, casual vacancies in the Legislative Council, like the House of Assembly, were also filled at by-elections. Amendments to the South Australian Constitution and Electoral Acts in that year saw the whole state become a single electorate for the Legislative Council and gave, in line with the Australian Senate, an assembly of members of both Houses of Parliament the right to meet to choose a replacement member. The constitution also states that if the previous sitting Legislative Council member was at the time of his/her election the representative of a particular political party, that party should nominate a replacement from amongst its own members.

List of by-elections
Gains for Labor are highlighted in red; for Liberal and its predecessors in blue; and others in grey.

See also
List of South Australian House of Assembly by-elections
List of South Australian Legislative Council appointments

References

Legislative Council by-elections